Bankura Assembly constituency is an assembly constituency in Bankura district in the Indian state of West Bengal.

Overview
As per orders of the Delimitation Commission, No. 252 Bankura Assembly constituency is composed of the following: Bankura municipality; Bankura I community development block; and Junbedia, Mankanali and Purandarpur gram panchayats of Bankura II community development block.

Bankura Assembly constituency is part of No. 36 Bankura (Lok Sabha constituency).

Members of Legislative Assembly

Election results

2016

.# Swing calculated on LF+Congress vote percentages taken together in 2016.

By-election 2012
In 2012, a by-election was necessitated by the death of sitting Trinamool Congress MLA Kashinath Misra . Minati Misra of Trinamool Congress defeated her nearest rival Nilanjan Dasgupta of CPI(M) by 15,138 votes.

2011

.# Swing calculated on Congress+Trinamool Congress vote percentages taken together in 2006.

1977-2006
In the 2006 state assembly elections, Partha De of CPI(M) won the Bankura assembly seat defeating his nearest rival Kashinath Mishra of Trinamool Congress. Contests in most years were multi cornered but only winners and runners are being mentioned. Kashinath Mishra of Trinamool Congress defeated Partha De of CPI(M) in 2001. Partha De of CPI(M) defeated Asis Chakraborty of Congress in 1996, and Kashinath Mishra of Congress in 1991 and 1987. Kashinath Mishra of Congress defeated Partha De of CPI(M) in 1982. Partha De of CPI(M) defeated Anandi Kundu of Janata Party in 1977.

1952-1972
Kashinath Mishra of Congress won in 1972 and 1971. Bireshwar Ghosh of CPI won in 1969. S.Mitra of Congress won in 1967. Aboni Bhattacharya of CPI won in 1962. Bankura had a dual seat in 1957. It was won by Shishuram Mandal and Anath Bandhu Roy, both of Congress. Rakhahari Chatterjee of Hindu Mahasabha won in independent India's first election in 1952.

References

Assembly constituencies of West Bengal
Politics of Bankura district
Bankura